Bez or BEZ may refer to:
 Bez (musician) (born 1983), Nigerian musician Emmanuel Bez Idakula
 Bez (dancer) (born Mark Berry, 1964), British DJ and dancer/percussionist with the Happy Mondays
 Claude Bez (1940–1999), former Chairman of Girondins de Bordeaux FC, the leading French club in the 1980s
 Bez, character in Hanna-Barbera animated Arabian Knights TV series

Places 
 Le Bez, a village in France
 Bez-et-Esparon, a commune in southern France
 Bez (Drôme), a tributary to the Drôme river in France
 Bez (Midouze), a tributary to the Midouze river in France

International codes 
 BEZ, the IATA code for Beru Island Airport, Gilbert Islands, Kiribati
 bez, the ISO 639-3 code for the language spoken by the Bena people in Tanzania

Other uses 
 Bez, part of an antler

See also
 Betz (disambiguation)
 Béez